A stored energy printer is a computer printer that uses the energy stored in a spring or magnetic field to push a hammer through a ribbon to print a dot. As compared to dot matrix printers that print a single column of dots at a time, this printer generally creates an entire line of dots at a time. Therefore, it is also known as a line matrix printer. This technology produces premium impact printers that print for millions to billions of dots per hammer. The advantage of this technology is that it has the lowest known cost of ownership: ink is transferred by conventional typewriter-style ribbons.

Technology and use
The most common printer to use this technology was the line-matrix printer made by Printronix and its licensees. In this type, the hammers are arranged as a "hammerbank"; a type of comb that oscillate horizontally to produce a line of dots.

A character matrix printer has also been produced. In this printer, the hammers are machined from an oval of magnetically permeable stainless steel, and the hammer-tips form vertical rows.

The original technology, patented by Printronix in 1974, has the top of a stiff leaf spring held back by a magnetic pole-piece. A tungsten carbide hammer is brazed to the center-top of the leaf spring. When it produces a dot, a coil (electromagnet) wrapped around the pole-piece neutralizes the magnetic field. The leaf spring snaps the hammer away from the pole-piece, pushing the hammer out against a ribbon and placing an image of a dot onto the paper.

Recent designs have performed complex optimizations in the magnetic circuit, and eliminated unwanted resonances in the spring. The result was a near-doubling of speed. Other improvements include the use of electrical discharge machining to produce complex, three-dimensional hammers that trade-off the magnetic circuit, mechanical resonances, and printing speed.

Normal wear usually occurs when the spring rubs against the pole-piece as it returns. This causes the pole-piece to wear, eventually requiring the pole pieces to be reground and recertified.

Hexavalent chrome plating on the pole-piece, combined with careful design, more than doubles speeds and improves life-span. It produces approximately a billion impressions per hammer.

Computer peripherals
Computer printers
Impact printers